The Whorse's Mouth is an experimental spoken word studio album by American musician Rozz Williams. It was released on June 3, 1996 by Hollows Hill, and was Williams' last studio album before his suicide in 1998. The Whorse's Mouth deals with Williams' heroin addiction, and features artwork consisting of collages compiled by Williams and Erik Christides. The album was re-released by Triple X Records in 2000.

Track listing

Personnel
The album production team consisted of
 Gary Dobbins – producer
 Jeff Zimmitti – design
 Paris Sadonis – clarinet, keyboards, producer
 Rozz Williams – bass guitar, vocals, production, lead vocals, design, album artwork
 Ryan Gaumer – lyrics, backing vocals
 Christian Omar Madrigal Izzo – drums on "Best of the Breed" and "Who's in Charge Here"
 Anne Marie – violin on "A Fire of Uncommon Velocity"
 Erik Christides – album artwork

References

1997 albums
Rozz Williams albums
2000 albums
Triple X Records albums
Spoken word albums by American artists